The L4 Teamwear Hampshire Premier League is a football competition based in Hampshire, England. The league was formed in 2007 and currently consists of a 'Senior Division' of 17 teams - including some previous members of the disbanded Division 2 of the Wessex League - and a Division One of 15 teams.

History

In May 2008 it was announced that the league was in talks with the Hampshire League 2004 about merging the two leagues into a new competition which it was hoped would officially gain Step 7 status, and although the merger did not take place, the status of the Hampshire Premier League at Step 7 of the National League System (or level 11 of the overall English football league system) was confirmed by The Football Association on 15 May 2008.  The Hampshire League then appealed to the FA, claiming it should gain similar status, but the appeal was rejected.

The Hampshire League 2004 was dissolved at the end of the 2012-13 season, with the majority of the teams joining the newly created Division One of the Hampshire Premier League.

Bush Hill won the Senior Division in 2019-20, subsequently changing their name to Millbrook and taking their place in the Wessex League for the 2020-21 season.

After two seasons of unfulfilled campaigns due to the covid pandemic, Colden Common's late charge ensured The Stallions took the Senior Division title on the last day of 2021-22. Meanwhile, QK Southampton triumphed in Division One South East, with Andover New Street Swifts claiming the Division One North crown.

The League removed the regionality of its second tier for the start of 2022-23, with teams from the previous South East and North forming a unified Division One.  The Supplementary Shield, brought in as an additional competition during the pandemic and won by Hook in 2021–22, was renamed The George Mason Memorial Shield, in honour of the league's former chairman.

Member clubs 2022–23

Senior Division
Andover New Street Swifts
Clanfield 
Colden Common
Denmead
Harvest
Hayling United
Liphook United
Liss Athletic
Locks Heath
Moneyfields Reserves
Overton United
Paulsgrove
QK Southampton
Stockbridge
Sway
Whitehill & Bordon
Winchester Castle

Division One
AFC Netley
AFC Petersfield
Broughton
Clarendon Juniors
Headley United
Hedge End Town
Hook
Infinity
Lyndhurst
Meon Milton
Michelmersh & Timsbury
Twentyten
Upham
Whiteley Wanderers

List of champions

References

External links
HPFL at fulltime.thefa.com

 
2007 establishments in England
Football in Hampshire
Football leagues in England
Sports leagues established in 2007